Donal Bisht is an Indian actress. Bisht is best known for her portrayal of Sharanya Bisht in Ek Deewaana Tha and Ishika Patel in Roop - Mard Ka Naya Swaroop.
She is known for Webshow Tu Zakhm Hai in 2022. In 2021, she participated in Bigg Boss 15. In 2019, Bisht ranked 18th in Times Most Desirable Women on TV.

Early life 
Donal was born on 27 August 1994 in Alwar, Rajasthan to Jaisingh Bisht and Jasumati Bisht, in a Hindu Rajput family whereas her native place is Uttarakhand.
She has an elder brother, Ranjan Bisht.

She worked as a journalist for the news channel, and was also an anchor for DD National's Chitrahaar.

Career

Debut and early roles (2015-2017)
Bisht was seen in a special appearance in Malayalam film D Company. She made her acting debut in 2015 with Airlines as a journalist. In the same year, she played Dr. Shelly Gaitonde in anthology series Twist Wala Love alongside Harshith Arora.

In 2016, she appeared as Daisy in the Hindi film Take Care. From 2015 to 2017, she played Sakshi Deol Garewal in Kalash-Ek Vishwaas. It was her first major screen appearance. She also appeared as Priyanka in an episode of Aye Zindagi.

Breakthrough and success (2018-2020)
Bisht had her breakthrough with Ek Deewaana Tha where she portrayed Sharanya Bisht opposite Namik Paul and Vikram Singh Chauhan from 2017 to 2018. She played Radhika post the leap. The show ended in 2018. In 2018, she appeared as Riya in an episode of Laal Ishq alongside Mrunal Jain.

From 2018 to 2019, she portrayed Ishika Patel, a headstrong girl in Roop - Mard Ka Naya Swaroop opposite Shashank Vyas. In 2019, she replaced Jasmin Bhasin as Happy Mehra in Dil Toh Happy Hai Ji. She played the role opposite Ansh Bagri. The show ended the same year.

2020 proved to be Bisht's busiest year. She first appeared as Ram Prasad's daughter in the Hindi film Pyaar Banam Khap Panchayat. Next, she played Donal in the short film Duniya in 2020, directed by Karan Sharma.

Bisht then made her web debut with Tia & Raj alongside Akshat Saluja. She played Tia and also produced the micro-web series. Then she portrayed Tamanna opposite Iqbal Khan. She also appeared in five music videos including 'Bepata', 'Alag Mera Yeh Rang Hain', 'Teri Patli Kamar', 'Betiyaan Pride of Nation' and 'Fukrapanti'.

Recent work and career expansion (2021-present)
In 2021, she appeared in the Hindi film In The Month of July, which released 7 years after it was completed
. She next appeared in music video 'Kinni Vari'. She portrayed Sasha Pink in the web series The Socho Project.

In October 2021, she participated in Bigg Boss 15 as a contestant. She was evicted on Day 18 by the housemates. In 2022, she appeared in music video 'Nikaah' with Afsana Khan.

Bisht is all set to make her Telugu and Kannada film debut with the bilingual Dare To Sleep  where she will be seen opposite Chetan Kumar. She will appear alongside Gashmeer Mahajani in the web series Zakhm.

In the media 
In 2019, Bisht ranked 18th in Times Most Desirable Women on TV.

Bisht walked the ramp for Amit Talwar in 2019 in Delhi. The same year she walked the ramp for Anu Ranjan's "Be With Beti" campaign at Indian Television Academy Awards.

Filmography

Television

South Films

Web

Music videos

Awards and nominations

See also 
 List of Indian television actresses
 List of Hindi television actresses

References

External links 

 

1994 births
Living people
Indian Hindus
Actresses from Uttarakhand
Indian soap opera actresses
Indian television actresses
Actresses in Hindi television
Bigg Boss (Hindi TV series) contestants